Michael Aufhauser (born April 25, 1952 Augsburg) is a German animal rights activist and founder of Gut Aiderbichl, the largest sanctuary for animals in Austria, which houses more than 1,000 animals of a variety of species. Meanwhile, 15 more farms under this model in Germany, Austria, Switzerland and one built in France, some of which are specialized in certain animal species.
Aufhauser drew a lot of attention of German and international mass media on his project when he bought a "runaway cow" called Yvonne in August 2011.

Works

See also
People for the Ethical Treatment of Animals
List of animal rights advocates

References

1952 births
German activists
German animal rights activists
Living people
People from Augsburg